Isaac ben Moses Abulafia (1824-1910) was a rabbi and halakhist. 

Abulafia, who was born in Tiberias, was rabbi of Damascus from c. 1877. His authoritarian attitude and his habit of making independent halakhic decisions roused the opposition of the other rabbis and of the communal leaders of Damascus, who united in an attempt to remove him from his position. In 1896 they turned to Moses ha-Levi, the Hakham Bashi, in Constantinople, who acceded to their request by appointing Solomon Eliezer Alfandari rabbi of Damascus. The two rabbis did not at first cooperate with each other. Later, however, Alfandari brought Abulafia into the sphere of his activities. Toward the end of his life Abulafia acted as rabbi in Tyre. From there he moved to Jerusalem, and finally to Tiberias, where he died. An outstanding halakhic scholar, his responsa Penei Yizhak were published in six volumes (1871-1906). Some scholars, especially Shalom Hai Gagin of Jerusalem, were critical of the first volume, and Abulafia wrote Lev Nishbar (1878) in reply to his critics.

Links to published works
Pene Yitzhaq vol. 1
Pene Yitzhaq vol. 2
Pene Yitzhaq vol. 3
Pene Yitzhaq vol. 4
Pene Yitzhaq vol. 5
Pene Yitzhaq vol. 6

19th-century rabbis from the Ottoman Empire
20th-century rabbis from the Ottoman Empire
1824 births
1910 deaths
Chief rabbis of cities
Rabbis in Ottoman Syria

People from Tiberias